In aerodynamics, a hypersonic speed is one that exceeds five times the speed of sound, often stated as starting at speeds of Mach 5 and above.

The precise Mach number at which a craft can be said to be flying at hypersonic speed varies, since individual physical changes in the airflow (like molecular dissociation and ionization) occur at different speeds; these effects collectively become important around Mach 5-10. The hypersonic regime can also be alternatively defined as speeds where specific heat capacity changes with the temperature of the flow as kinetic energy of the moving object is converted into heat.

Characteristics of flow

While the definition of hypersonic flow can be quite vague and is generally debatable (especially due to the absence of discontinuity between supersonic and hypersonic flows), a hypersonic flow may be characterized by certain physical phenomena that can no longer be analytically discounted as in supersonic flow. The peculiarity in hypersonic flows are as follows:
 Shock layer
 Aerodynamic heating
 Entropy layer
 Real gas effects
 Low density effects
 Independence of aerodynamic coefficients with Mach number.

Small shock stand-off distance
As a body's Mach number increases, the density behind a bow shock generated by the body also increases, which corresponds to a decrease in volume behind the shock due to conservation of mass. Consequently, the distance between the bow shock and the body decreases at higher Mach numbers.

Entropy layer
As Mach numbers increase, the entropy change across the shock also increases, which results in a strong entropy gradient and highly vortical flow that mixes with the boundary layer.

Viscous interaction
A portion of the large kinetic energy associated with flow at high Mach numbers transforms into internal energy in the fluid due to viscous effects. The increase in internal energy is realized as an increase in temperature. Since the pressure gradient normal to the flow within a boundary layer is approximately zero for low to moderate hypersonic Mach numbers, the increase of temperature through the boundary layer coincides with a decrease in density. This causes the bottom of the boundary layer to expand, so that the boundary layer over the body grows thicker and can often merge with the shock wave near the body leading edge.

High-temperature flow
High temperatures due to a manifestation of viscous dissipation cause non-equilibrium chemical flow properties such as vibrational excitation and dissociation and ionization of molecules resulting in convective and radiative heat-flux.

Classification of Mach regimes 

Although "subsonic" and "supersonic" usually refer to speeds below and above the local speed of sound respectively, aerodynamicists often use these terms to refer to particular ranges of Mach values. This occurs because a "transonic regime" exists around M=1 where approximations of the Navier–Stokes equations used for subsonic design no longer apply, partly because the flow locally exceeds M=1 even when the freestream Mach number is below this value.

The "supersonic regime" usually refers to the set of Mach numbers for which linearised theory may be used; for example, where the (air) flow is not chemically reacting and where heat transfer between air and vehicle may be reasonably neglected in calculations. Generally, NASA defines "high" hypersonic as any Mach number from 10 to 25, and re-entry speeds as anything greater than Mach 25. Among the spacecraft operating in these regimes are returning Soyuz and Dragon space capsules; the previously-operated Space Shuttle; various reusable spacecraft in development such as SpaceX Starship and Rocket Lab Electron; as well as (theoretical) spaceplanes.

In the following table, the "regimes" or "ranges of Mach values" are referenced instead of the usual meanings of "subsonic" and "supersonic".

Similarity parameters
The categorization of airflow relies on a number of similarity parameters, which allow the simplification of a nearly infinite number of test cases into groups of similarity. For transonic and compressible flow, the Mach and Reynolds numbers alone allow good categorization of many flow cases.

Hypersonic flows, however, require other similarity parameters. First, the analytic equations for the oblique shock angle become nearly independent of Mach number at high (~>10) Mach numbers. Second, the formation of strong shocks around aerodynamic bodies means that the freestream Reynolds number is less useful as an estimate of the behavior of the boundary layer over a body (although it is still important). Finally, the increased temperature of hypersonic flow mean that real gas effects become important. Research in hypersonics is therefore often called aerothermodynamics, rather than aerodynamics.

The introduction of real gas effects means that more variables are required to describe the full state of a gas. Whereas a stationary gas can be described by three variables (pressure, temperature, adiabatic index), and a moving gas by four (flow velocity), a hot gas in chemical equilibrium also requires state equations for the chemical components of the gas, and a gas in nonequilibrium solves those state equations using time as an extra variable. This means that for nonequilibrium flow, something between 10 and 100 variables may be required to describe the state of the gas at any given time. Additionally, rarefied hypersonic flows (usually defined as those with a Knudsen number above 0.1) do not follow the Navier–Stokes equations.

Hypersonic flows are typically categorized by their total energy, expressed as total enthalpy (MJ/kg), total pressure (kPa-MPa), stagnation pressure (kPa-MPa), stagnation temperature (K), or flow velocity (km/s).

Wallace D. Hayes developed a similarity parameter, similar to the Whitcomb area rule, which allowed similar configurations to be compared.

Regimes
Hypersonic flow can be approximately separated into a number of regimes. The selection of these regimes is rough, due to the blurring of the boundaries where a particular effect can be found.

Perfect gas
In this regime, the gas can be regarded as an ideal gas. Flow in this regime is still Mach number dependent. Simulations start to depend on the use of a constant-temperature wall, rather than the adiabatic wall typically used at lower speeds. The lower border of this region is around Mach 5, where ramjets become inefficient, and the upper border around Mach 10-12.

Two-temperature ideal gas
This is a subset of the perfect gas regime, where the gas can be considered chemically perfect, but the rotational and vibrational temperatures of the gas must be considered separately, leading to two temperature models. See particularly the modeling of supersonic nozzles, where vibrational freezing becomes important.

Dissociated gas
In this regime, diatomic or polyatomic gases (the gases found in most atmospheres) begin to dissociate as they come into contact with the bow shock generated by the body. Surface catalysis plays a role in the calculation of surface heating, meaning that the type of surface material also has an effect on the flow. The lower border of this regime is where any component of a gas mixture first begins to dissociate in the stagnation point of a flow (which for nitrogen is around 2000 K). At the upper border of this regime, the effects of ionization start to have an effect on the flow.

Ionized gas
In this regime the ionized electron population of the stagnated flow becomes significant, and the electrons must be modeled separately. Often the electron temperature is handled separately from the temperature of the remaining gas components. This region occurs for freestream flow velocities around 3-4 km/s. Gases in this region are modeled as non-radiating plasmas.

Radiation-dominated regime
Above around 12 km/s, the heat transfer to a vehicle changes from being conductively dominated to radiatively dominated. The modeling of gases in this regime is split into two classes:
Optically thin: where the gas does not re-absorb radiation emitted from other parts of the gas
Optically thick: where the radiation must be considered a separate source of energy.
The modeling of optically thick gases is extremely difficult, since, due to the calculation of the radiation at each point, the computation load theoretically expands exponentially as the number of points considered increases.

See also

Supersonic transport
Lifting body
Atmospheric entry
Hypersonic flight
DARPA Falcon Project
Reaction Engines Skylon (design study)
Reaction Engines A2 (design study)
HyperSoar (concept)
X-51 A Waverider
X-20 Dyna-Soar (cancelled)
Rockwell X-30 (cancelled)
Avatar RLV (2001 Indian concept study)
Hypersonic Technology Demonstrator Vehicle (Indian project)
Ayaks (Russian wave rider project from the 1990s)
Avangard (Russian hypersonic glide vehicle, in service)
DF-ZF (Chinese hypersonic glide vehicle, operational)
Lockheed Martin SR-72 (Planned)

Engines
Rocket engine
Ramjet
Scramjet
Reaction Engines SABRE, LAPCAT (design studies)

Missiles
Shaurya (missile) Ballistic Missile -  India (Entered Production)
BrahMos-II Cruise Missile -   (Under Development)
9K720 Iskander Short-range ballistic missile  Russia (Currently In Service)
3M22 Zircon Anti-ship hypersonic cruise missile  (in production)
R-37 (missile) Hypersonic air-to-air missile  (in service)
Kh-47M2 Kinzhal Hypersonic air-launched ballistic missile  (in service)

Other flow regimes
 Subsonic flight
 Transonic
 Supersonic speed

References

External links

NASA's Guide to Hypersonics
Hypersonics Group at Imperial College
University of Queensland Centre for Hypersonics
High Speed Flow Group at University of New South Wales
Hypersonics Group at the University of Oxford

Aerodynamics
Aerospace engineering
Airspeed
Spacecraft propulsion